The 1948 United States Senate election in Virginia was held on November 2, 1948. Incumbent Democratic Senator Absalom Willis Robertson defeated Republican Robert H. Woods and was re-elected to his first full term in office.

Results

See also 
 United States Senate elections, 1948 and 1949

References

Virginia
1948
1948 Virginia elections